CounterSpin may refer to:

 CounterSpin (TV series), a Canadian television program on CBC Newsworld from 1998 to 2004, (counterspin.tv). 
 CounterSpin, weekly radio program produced by Fairness & Accuracy in Reporting, aired on more than 150 stations throughout the United States.